Nederslingeland is a polder in the Dutch province of South Holland. It is located about 5 km northwest of the city of Gorinchem. The hamlet Pinkeveer is located in the polder.

Nederslingeland was a separate municipality between 1817 and 1857, when it became part of Peursum.

References

Former municipalities of South Holland
Polders of South Holland
Molenlanden